National Professor is a prestigious teaching award given by the Government of Bangladesh for outstanding contribution on the field of education. It is awarded by the president of Bangladesh according to Bangladesh National Professor Resolution (appointment, conditions and facilities) 1981. The awarded persons receive various facilities from the government.

 They will receive a fixed amount of salary through the University Grants Commission.
 They will be able to do any educational/research work in with any research organisation/institute in their choice.
 They will receive all the facilities from the respected organisations/institutes.
 They will be able to join any foreign university as visiting professor.
 They will not be able to take any salary from any other organisations/institutes except the government.
 They will not be treated as government officers.

List of National Professors
1975
Zainul Abedin
Abdur Razzaq
Qazi Motahar Hossain
1984
Muhammad Ibrahim
1987
Nurul Islam
Abul Fazl Atwar Husain
Syed Ali Ahsan
1993
Dewan Mohammad Azraf
Shamsul Hoque
M Innas Ali
1994
MR Khan
Sufia Ahmed
1998
 Kabir Chowdhury
2006
Abdul Malik
AKM Nurul Islam
AKM Aminul Haque
Talukder Moniruzzaman
2011
Sardar Fazlul Karim
A.F. Salahuddin Ahmed
Rangalal Sen
Mustafa Nurul Islam
Shahla Khatun
2018
Rafiqul Islam
Anisuzzaman
Jamilur Reza Choudhury
2021
Prof A K Azad Khan
Alamgir Mohammad Sirajuddin
 Mahmud Hassan

References

Education in Bangladesh
 
Civil awards and decorations of Bangladesh